Club Deportivo Árabe Unido is a professional football club located in Colón, Panama that plays in Liga Panameña de Fútbol, the top tier of the Panamanian football pyramid. The club plays its games in Estadio Armando Dely Valdés.

Its name, Árabe Unido, means "Arab Union" in English, is emphasised from its original Arab root of the club.

History
The club has been one of the most successful in Panama in recent years, winning 15 titles (more than any other team since 1998) and finishing second five times.

It was founded in 1990 by Arab immigrants to Panama, under the name of Club Atlético Argentina, and experienced immediate success. After climbing the Panamanian league system, in 1994 they took advantage of a split in Panama's governing body to move into the top division. What happened was that a rival league (LINFUNA) formed in opposition to the older, existing top flight (ANAPROF). Árabe Unido was almost immediately successful in LINFUNA, winning both championships that the splinter league held in 1994 and 1995.

Their success continued once they re-entered ANAPROF; at that time, Tauro FC was the dominant team in the league and would win three championships in four years between 1996-2000.  The only club to break that string was Árabe Unido, which won the 1998-99 title by beating Tauro 3-0 in the playoff final.

After the league switched to the Aprtura/Clausura format in the 2001 season, Los Arabes really began winning titles.  The original plan was for the winners of the Apertura to meet the Clausura in a "Grand Final" that would determine the year's champion.  Árabe rendered this unnecessary by winning both tournaments.  They claimed a third straight championship in Apertura 2002, although they did lose that year's grand final to Plaza Amador.

El Expreso Azul (as fans also called Árabe Unido) would go on to add further honors by sweeping the 2003 season, then winning back to back titles in Clausura 2008 and Apertura 2009.  They have also won titles in Clausura 2010, Apertura 2012, Clausura 2015, Apertura 2015, and most recently Apertura 2016.l

Honours

National titles
Liga Panameña de Fútbol: (13)
1998–99, 2001 Apertura, 2001 Clausura, 2002 Apertura, 2004 Apertura, 2004 Clausura, 2008 Clausura, 2009 Apertura, 2010 Clausura, 2012 Apertura, 2015 Clausura, 2015 Apertura, 2016 Apertura

LINFUNA: 2 (Record)
1994–95, 1995–96

International titles
UNCAF Interclub Cup: 0
Runners-up (1): 2002

CONCACAF Champions' Cup: 2 appearance
1996 – Qualifying stage (Central Zone)
2003 – First Round

CONCACAF League: 2 appearances
2017 – Semifinals
2018 – Semifinals

CONCACAF Champions League: 5 appearances
2009–10 – Quarterfinal
2010–11 – Group Stage
2013–14 – Quarterfinal
2015–16 – Group Stage
2016–17 – Quarterfinal

Players

Current squad
As of 10 February, 2023.

Retired numbers
21 —  Amílcar Henríquez, midfielder (2003–08) — posthumous honour.

Historical list of coaches

 Eliazar Herrera (1998–99)
 Richard Parra (2001–03)
 Jairo Silva (2003–04)
 Juan Carlos Gómez Cáceres (2004)
 Ramón Vecinos (2005–06)
 Wiston Cifuentes (2006)
 José Alfredo Poyatos (2007)
 Richard Parra (Aug 2009–Nov 10)
 Wilman Conde (Dec 2010–June 11)
 Carlos Pérez Porras (June 2011–Nov 11)
 Jair Palacios (Dec 2011–Aug 14)
 Julio Dely Valdés (August 2014–Dec 2014)
 Alfonso de Moya (Jan 2015–15)
 Sergio Guzmán (February 2015 – December 2017)
 Carlos Ruiz (January 2018 - September 2018)
 José Ricardo "Chicho" Pérez (September 2018 - June 2019)
 Alejandro Mejía (June 2019 - September 2019)
 Sergio Guzmán (September 2019 - August 2021)
 Sergio Angulo (August 2021-Present)

References

External links
  

 
Aribe Unido
Aribe Unido
1994 establishments in Panama